East Kilbride Central North is one of the 20 electoral wards of South Lanarkshire Council. Created in 2007, the ward initially elected four councillors using the single transferable vote electoral system and covers an area with a population of 16,547 people. Following a boundary review, the ward has elected three councillors since 2017.

The ward has produced strong results for both Labour and the Scottish National Party (SNP) with the parties initially sharing the seats evenly. However, since 2017, the ward has become an SNP stronghold with the party holding two of the three seats.

Following the 2022 election, the ward has been the seat of the leader of South Lanarkshire Council, Cllr Joe Fagan.

Boundaries
The ward was created following the Fourth Statutory Reviews of Electoral Arrangements ahead of the 2007 Scottish local elections. As a result of the Local Governance (Scotland) Act 2004, local elections in Scotland would use the single transferable vote electoral system from 2007 onwards so East Kilbride Central North was formed from an amalgamation of several previous first-past-the-post wards. It contained the majority of the former East Mains and West Mains wards as well as part of the former Heatheryknowe and Calderglen wards and all of the former Blacklaw and Maxwellton wards. As the name suggests, East Kilbride Central North covers the parts of East Kilbride just north of the town centre with the southern boundary being the Queensway (A726) dual carriageway, including the central retail and administrative area itself as well as the neighbourhoods of East Mains, Kirktonholme, the Village and West Mains, most of St Leonards (west of High Common Road) and part of Calderwood (Maxwellton/west of Calderwood Road). Following the Fifth Statutory Reviews of Electoral Arrangements ahead of the 2017 Scottish local elections, a few streets in the east of the ward between Calderwood Road, Morrishall Road and Hunter Primary School were transferred to the East Kilbride East ward. Although this only had a small effect on the electorate, it caused the loss of one seat from the original four to balance with other wards with similar populations.

Councillors

Election results

2022 election

2019 by-election

2017 election

2012 election

2007 election

Notes

References

Wards of South Lanarkshire
East Kilbride